Apčak is a village located in Minsk District, Minsk Region, Belarus.

In the Polish–Lithuanian Commonwealth, Apčak was located in Minsk Voivodeship. It was ceded to Russia as a result of Second Partition. Within the borders of Russia, the village belonged to Minsky Uyezd in Minsk Governorate. Again under the Polish administration in the years 1919–1920, Apčak was located in the Civil Administration of the Eastern Lands.

References

Villages in Belarus
Populated places in Minsk Region
Minsk District
Minsky Uyezd